Tasso Adamopoulos (June 1944 – 3 January 2021) was a French violist of Greek origin.

Life and career
Adamopoulos was born in Paris, France. After musical studies in Israel, he became a violist soloist at the Rotterdam Philharmonic Orchestra at the age of 19. Subsequently, he was successively soloist at the Gulbenkian Orchestra, the Ensemble orchestral de Paris and the Orchestre national de France from 1980 to 1990. From 1990, he was a soloist at the Orchestre National Bordeaux Aquitaine and a member of the Sartory Trio, with Roland Daugareil and Étienne Péclard.

In addition to his concert activity, Adamopoulos taught at the Conservatoire national supérieur de musique et de danse de Lyon and the Conservatoire de Bordeaux where he was responsible for the viola class of the development cycle.

He played a Landolfi viola dated 1755.

Adamopoulos, who had cancer, died on 3 January 2021, in Paris after contracting COVID-19 during the COVID-19 pandemic in France.

References

External links 
 Biography of Tasso Adamopoulos  on Hexagone.net
 Tasso Adamopoulos on data.bnf.fr
 Tasso Adamopoulos on Khloros International Production
 Chaconne BACH 4 Violas with Tasso Adamopoulos, Elçim Ozdemir, Stéphane Rougier & Nicolas Mouret
 Hommage to Tasso Adamopoulos on French public radio broadcast France Musique 
 Newspaper article on Portuguese daily newspaper Público
 SIC Notícias Portuguese private television channel website on Tasso Adamopoulos' death
 Obituary on The Violin Channel
 Opéra National de Bordeaux on Tasso Adamopoulos death

1944 births
2021 deaths
French classical violists
Musicians from Paris
French music educators
20th-century French musicians
20th-century French male musicians
20th-century classical musicians
21st-century French musicians
21st-century French male musicians
21st-century classical musicians
French people of Greek descent
Deaths from the COVID-19 pandemic in France
20th-century violists
21st-century violists